Ragannaguda is a village in Rangareddy district in Telangana, India.

References

Villages in Ranga Reddy district